18 Days (translit. Tamantashar Yom) is an Egyptian anthology film focusing on the 18 days of the 2011 Egyptian revolution. It premiered at the 2011 Cannes Film Festival.

A group of ten directors, twenty or so actors, six writers, eight directors of photography, eight sound engineers, five set designers, three costume designers, seven editors, three post-production companies, and about ten technicians have agreed to act fast and shoot, with no budget and on a voluntary basis, ten short films about the January 25 revolution in Egypt. Ten stories they have experienced, heard or imagined.

All the proceeds of this movie will be devoted to organizing convoys to provide political and civic education in the villages of Egypt.

The films are:
 Retention by Sherif Arafa
 God’s Creation by Kamla Abou Zikri
 19-19 by Marwan Hamed
 When the Flood Hits You… by Mohamed Ali
 Curfew by Sherif El Bendary
 Revolution Cookies by Khaled Marei
 Tahrir 2/2 by Mariam Abou Ouf
 Window by Ahmad Abdalla
 Interior/Exterior by Yousry Nasrallah
 Ashraf Seberto by Ahmad Alaa

References

External links
 

Films about the Egyptian revolution of 2011
2011 films
21st-century Egyptian films
2011 short films
2011 drama films
Egyptian revolution of 2011
Anthology films
Films directed by Yousry Nasrallah
Films set in 2011
Egyptian short films
Egyptian drama films